Jonathan Burks (born October 4, 1964), better known by his stage name Jaz-O (formerly The Jaz), is an American rapper and record producer active in the late 1980s through the 1990s, best known for being the mentor of Brooklyn rapper Jay-Z. Burks is nicknamed "the Originator", and had a song titled "The Originators" that featured a young Jay-Z in 1990.

Early life
Jonathan Burks was born in the Brooklyn borough of New York City and raised in Marcy Houses, a housing project in the Bedford-Stuyvesant neighborhood. Originally attending college to become an accountant, he decided to become a rapper after being encouraged by a friend, and being inspired after hearing UTFO's "Roxanne, Roxanne."

Career

Early years and signing with EMI USA
Being from the same projects as Jay-Z, the two would meet and become friends, with Jaz-O being a rhyme mentor to Jay-Z. Sometime during the year of 1986, the two lyricists would soon form a short-lived group by the name of High Potent. Despite the group being short-lived, the two recorded and released several songs throughout 1986, before Jaz-O would go on and get a record deal with EMI USA. In regards to the signing, he stated:

I had been rhyming since I was 14. Do the math on your own! I became a legend on the east coast - which in the 'eighties' was quite remarkable, in about six years. I was always told I was the best most had ever heard. I put out a song in 1985 called "HP Gets Busy" on our own label (my manager at the time, Jack Walker and I), featuring two of my comrades from Long Island, NY, and my young apprentice, Jay Z. We did shows regionally; NY and Pittsburgh mostly. Meanwhile, I was recording with friend and producer, Fresh Gordon. He helped me get a single deal on Tommy Boy Records after I collaborated on a song with him called "My Fila" (a response to Run DMC's, "My Adidas"). A mutual friend of Gordon and I, Marlon Prescott, introduced me to my soon-to-be manager at that time, Stan Poses. In four months Stan solidified a major artist deal for me, and I became the first rap artist ever to sign with EMI Records. I also became the recipient of the largest advance and recording budget of any rap artist at that time.

1989: Word to the Jaz
Several months after signing with EMI USA, Jaz-O went on a trip to London, where he would record his debut album. Joining him on the trip was Jay-Z, as well as future Murder Inc Records CEO and producer Irv Gotti, who was Jaz-O's DJ at the time. After completion, Jaz-O released his debut album Word to the Jaz. The album was produced by Bryan "Chuck" New, Pete Q. Harris and Jaz-O himself. The album peaked at number 87 on the Top R&B/Hip-Hop Albums chart. It featured a guest appearance from Jay-Z on the song "Hawaiian Sophie", which peaked at number 18 on the Hot Rap Songs chart. The single "Let's Play House"/"Buss the Speaker" peaked at number 26 on the Billboard Dance Club Songs chart.

Jaz-O also made a guest appearance on The O'Jays's "Have You Had Your Love Today", which was a single released from their 1989 album Serious.

1990: To Your Soul
Jaz-O released his second album To Your Soul on July 16, 1990. Despite the album not reaching the Billboard charts, its two singles, "The Originators" and "A Groove (This Is What U Rap 2)", peaked at No. 13 and No. 18, respectively, on the Hot Rap Songs chart. Similar to his debut album, Jay-Z was the only guest, being featured on two songs.

1991–1996: Production work behind the scenes
Sometime after the album was released, Jaz-O was dropped from his record label and began to spend time working behind the scenes as a producer. At some point, Jaz-O connected with The Lox, and produced a demo tape for the group, which would become instrumental to the start of their successful career. Fellow Yonkers native Mary J. Blige, would receive the tape from a cousin who did music with the trio. Becoming a supporter of the group, Blige would pass the demo tape on to Bad Boy CEO Sean "Puffy" Combs while on a tour with Jodeci. Liking what he heard, Puff shortly signed The Lox to a deal.

1996–1998: Involvement with Jay-Z's early success
Throughout the late 1990s, Jaz-O had quite a hand in Jay-Z's early solo success. Jaz-O produced, and was featured on "Ain't No Nigga," the second single from Jay-Z's 1996 debut album, Reasonable Doubt. The song is cited as playing a significant role in securing Jay-Z's record with Def Jam.

Jaz-O produced "Rap Game / Crack Game," a track that appeared on Jay's second album In My Lifetime, Vol. 1, which was released in the year of 1997.

Jaz-O produced two tracks for Jay-Z's Streets Is Watching. The album fared well commercially reaching #3 on the Top R&B/Hip-Hop Albums chart, and was released May 12, 1998, by Roc-A-Fella Records and Def Jam Records.

In the year of 1999, Jaz-O appeared on Jay-Z's "Nigga What, Nigga Who (Originator 99)", a single that was released from Jay-Z's third album Vol. 2... Hard Knock Life. The song became a big hit in Jaz-O's career at that time. However, this would be one of the last times the two would work together on music, for the friendship soured shortly afterwards.

1999–2016: Feud with Jay-Z and forming Kingz Kounty 
The long-standing feud between him and Jay-Z started when Jay-Z started Roc-A-Fella Records and he tried to convince Jaz-O and fellow rapper Sauce Money to sign with the label. They both refused. It is rumored that they didn't trust Roc-A-Fella Records CEO's Damon Dash and Kareem "Biggs" Burke.  In addition, they weren't satisfied with what they were to be receiving had they signed the contract, $300,000 in Jaz-O's case. Jay-Z confirms this event on the song "What We Talkin' About" on the Blueprint 3 album when he says "Dame made millions, even Jaz made some scraps, he could've made more but he ain't sign his contract".

Instead of signing with Roc-A-Fella Records, Jaz-O inked a deal with Rancore Records, and formed the hip-hop group Immobilarie. With the group, he released a collaboration album Jaz-O & The Immobilarie Family Present: Kingz Kounty.

Jay-Z went on to diss Jaz first on a track released by DJ Kayslay featuring Freeway, Geda K, Young Chris, and Memphis Bleek titled "Fuck Jaz-O AKA Jaz Ho" in which they rapped over Styles P's "Good Times" instrumental and later on his album The Blueprint 2: The Gift & The Curse. Jay-Z states on the track, "I'ma let karma catch up to Jaz-O." Jaz responded with a record on a DJ Kayslay mixtape entitled "Ova" and after the response from Jay-Z and the members of Roc-A-Fella, he released his own response with the diss record known as "Ova Part 2" in which he raps over N.O.R.E.'s "Nothin'" instrumental.

Despite the long-standing feud between mentor and protégé, Jay-Z still gives Jaz-O credit for his success (although he disses him at the same time) as heard in the song "I Do It For Hip Hop" on Ludacris's Theater of the Mind album. Jay-Z says "Shout out to Grand Master Flash and to Caz and even Jaz's bum ass".

Soon after the "I Do It For Hip Hop" diss from Jay-Z, Jaz-O responded with a diss record entitled "Go Harder" where he starts by rapping over his protege's "Brooklyn Go Hard" beat before the beat changes.

In late August 2009, Jaz-O was featured on another song dissing Jay-Z entitled "Gangstas Ride" with West Coast rapper, The Game. Jaz references "Ether" with the line, "Jaz-O, stupid motherfucker, not Shawn, never been bashed on a Tupac song". The song was fueled by the beef between Game and Jay-Z.

2017: Reunion with Jay-Z and signing with Roc Nation
In December 2017 they reunited at Jay Z's 4:44 concert seemingly ending the feud. In the year of 2019, it was reported that the two worked out a music deal for Jaz-O's Kingz Kounty Media Group to distributed through Jay-Z's Roc Nation's Equity Distribution.

On February 7, 2020, Jaz-O released an extended play (EP) titled The Warmup, on Kingz Kounty Media Group, and distributed by Roc Nation's Equity Distribution.

2021: Other ventures and releases 
Currently Jaz-O has moved his 'Kingz Kounty Music Group" to Rival Distribution. Releasing a collaboration single "Lookin' Like" with Nipsey Hussle on July 2, 2021. The music video is directed by Da Inphamus Amadeuz.

Musical style

Influences
Jaz-O cites Grandmaster Caz as an early influence. Caz was the artist who made Jaz-O decide to become a rapper.

Rhyming style
Jaz-O was the rapper to pioneer the triplet flow, which allows the rapper to flow far beyond sixteen syllables within the 4/4 time signature. Being able to add extra syllables to the sixteen multiplies the syllables into twenty-fourths, which makes a triplet of an eighth. Since the 1990s, the triplet rhyme technique has become a common distinction among some of the most respected hip-hop lyricists. Several lyricists who are well known for the technique include former apprentice Jay-Z, as well as Twista, Bone Thugs-N-Harmony, Fu-Schnickens, Spice-1, and Tech N9ne.

Personal life
Jaz-O was known to be a visible figure in the Nuwaubian Nation during the 1980s. Nuwaubian beliefs and symbolism were prominent in the earlier years of his music career, and Nuwaubian fashion influenced his wardrobe.

Discography

Studio albums 
 Word to the Jaz (1989)
 To Your Soul (1990)
 Kingz Kounty (2002) (with the Immobilarie)

Extended plays 
 Ya Don't Stop (1991)
 The Warmup (2020)

Singles

Production credits
Besides being an emcee, he has produced songs for several hip hop artists other than Jay-Z, such as Group Home, M.O.P, Ras Kass, Rakim, Kool G Rap, and others.

Solo
 1995: Group Home - "4 Give My Sins"|Livin' Proof 
 1996: M.O.P. - "Born 2 Kill", "World Famous", "Lifestyles of a Ghetto Child", "Born 2 Kill" (Jazz Mix)"  Firing Squad
 1996: Jay-Z - "Ain't No Nigga"|Reasonable Doubt 
 1997: P Diddy - "I Got the Power" (Featuring The Lox)    |   No Way Out
 1997: Jay-Z - "Rap Game / Crack Game""    |   In My Lifetime, Vol. 1
 1998: Usual Suspects - "Crazy"  Streets Is Watching (soundtrack)
 1998: Ras Kass - "H2O Proof"    |   Rasassination
 1998: Jay-Z - "In My Lifetime (remix)" Streets Is Watching (soundtrack)
 1998: Queen Latifah - "Court Is in Session"    |   Order in the Court
 1999: Rakim - "It's A Must"    |   The Master
 2002: Kool G Rap - "Black Widow"    |   The Giacana Story
 2002: GZA - " Legend Of The Liquid Sword"|Legend of the Liquid Sword

References

1964 births
Living people
African-American male rappers
African-American record producers
African-American songwriters
American hip hop record producers
East Coast hip hop musicians
Nuwaubianism
Rappers from Brooklyn
Songwriters from New York (state)
21st-century American rappers
Record producers from New York (state)
21st-century American male musicians
20th-century African-American people
American male songwriters